Elosita is a genus of moths of the family Crambidae. It contains only one species, Elosita fuscocilialis, which is found on Java.

References

Pyraustinae
Crambidae genera
Monotypic moth genera
Taxa named by Pieter Cornelius Tobias Snellen